Erma Reka is a village in Zlatograd municipality, Smolyan Province, southern Bulgaria, near the border with Greece.

Villages in Smolyan Province